Huangzhou is an urban town and the county seat of Xinhuang Dong Autonomous County in Hunan, China. The seat of local government is at Dadongping Village.

History
The town is located in the northwest of the county, it was reformed to merge Xinlong Town, Fangjiatun Township, Dawanluo Township and the Huangzhou Town on November 19, 2015. The seat of local government is at Dadongping Village.

Administrative division
As of 2015, the town is divided into seven communities and 56 villages.

Geography
The Wushui River winds through the town.

There are two reservoirs in the town, namely the Yangjia'ao Reservoir and Banxi Reservoir.

There are a number of popular mountains located immediately adjacent to the townsite which include Mount Lengfengpo; Mount Wanbao; and Mount Gunmapo.

Economy
The local economy is primarily based upon agriculture and local industry.

Transport
The town is connected to three highways: the G60 Shanghai–Kunming Expressway and National Highway G320, both head east to Zhijiang Dong Autonomous County and west to Yuping Dong Autonomous County. And the Provincial Highway S232 passes across the town north to south.

The Shanghai–Kunming high-speed railway is a high-speed railway passes across the town northeast to southwest.

References

Bibliography
 

Xinhuang
County seats in Hunan